13 Cancri (abbreviated to 13 Cnc) is a K-type giant star in the constellation Cancer. It has an apparent magnitude of +6.41 and is approximately 970 light years from Earth.

Its designation is unusual as it is one of a very few stars which have a Bayer designation and are not in the Bright Star Catalog, although the designation ψ1 Cancri is rarely used.  It is one of the few stars with a Flamsteed designation that are not listed in the Bright Star Catalogue.

References

Cancri, Psi1
Cancer (constellation)
K-type giants
Cancri, 13
040007
067690
BD+26 1728